Mustafa Şentop (born 6 August 1968) is a Turkish politician from the Justice and Development Party (AKP) who has served as the Member of Parliament for Istanbul in the 24, 25, 26th legislative terms.

On 24 February 2019, he was elected as the 29th Speaker of the Grand National Assembly.

Early life and career 

Mustafa Şentop was born on 6 August 1968 in Tekirdağ. He graduated from Istanbul University Faculty of Law and took a master's degree and a doctorate in the field of public law at Marmara University. In 1993, he started to work in Marmara University Faculty of Law as a research assistant. He got a Ph.D. title in 2002, became an associate professor in 2005, and a professor in 2011. Apart from Marmara University, he gave undergraduate and post-graduate lectures in various universities. He took several administrative functions at Marmara University. Beginning from his university years, he functioned as a writer and editor in various journals and was a member of the editorial board of academic journals and editor of referred journals. He also served as the Chairman of the Istanbul Branch of the Economic and Social Research Centre (ESAM).

Political career
Şentop was elected as a member of the Justice and Development Party (AKP)'s Central Decision-Making and Administrative Committee at the 4th and 5th Party Congresses. He served as Deputy Chairman of AKP from 2012 to 2015.

He was elected as Member of Parliament for Istanbul in the 24th, 25th, and 26th legislative terms for Tekirdağ in the 27th legislative term.

He served as Deputy Chairman of the Committee on the Constitution. He took charge at Reconciliation Committee on Constitution as the representative of AKP. He served as the Chairman of the Committee on Constitution in the 26th Legislative Term.

Serving as the Deputy Speaker of the Grand National Assembly of Turkey in the 27th Legislative Term, on February 24, 2019 he was elected as the 29th Speaker of the Grand National Assembly of Turkey celebrating the centenary of its inauguration in 2020. On July 7, 2020 he was re-elected as Speaker for the second term.

Şentop condemned the peace agreement between Israel and the United Arab Emirates, calling it "disgraceful" and a betrayal of the Palestinian cause.

Şentop is fluent in English and Arabic.

Personal life 
He is married and has four children.

Foreign honours 
  Turkmenistan: Order "For great love for independent Turkmenistan" (2022)

See also
List of Turkish academics

References

External links

MP profile at the Grand National Assembly website
Collection of all relevant news items at Haberler.com
global.tbmm.gov.tr

Living people
1968 births
People from Tekirdağ
Deputies of Istanbul
Justice and Development Party (Turkey) politicians
Academic staff of Marmara University
Marmara University alumni
Istanbul University alumni
Istanbul University Faculty of Law alumni
Members of the 24th Parliament of Turkey
Members of the 25th Parliament of Turkey
Members of the 26th Parliament of Turkey